Jobanpreet Singh is a Punjabi actor. He is best known for Saak, Kande and Rupinder Gandhi 2.

Early life 
Singh belongs to Ludhiana, Punjab.

Filmography

Upcoming 

 Kikli

Awards and nominations 
PTC Punjabi Best Debut Actor (nominated)

References 

Year of birth missing (living people)
Living people
Male actors from Ludhiana
21st-century Indian male actors
Indian male film actors